Révész Géza utcai Stadion is a multi-use stadium in Siófok, Hungary.  It is currently used mostly for football matches and is the home stadium of BFC Siófok. The stadium is able to hold 6,500 people. The stadium was named after Géza Révesz Street (Révész Géza utca) while the street was named after politician Géza Révész (1878-1955) born in Siófok.

External links 
 Révész Géza Stadion at magyarfutball.hu

Football venues in Hungary
Buildings and structures in Somogy County